Hoplia is a genus of monkey beetles in the family Scarabaeidae. There are at least 300 described species in Hoplia.

See also
 List of Hoplia species

References

Further reading

External links

 
 

Melolonthinae